Pop'n TwinBee: Rainbow Bell Adventures is a video game published and developed by Konami, released for the Super Famicom/Super NES. Released first in Japan, it later appeared in Europe. Rainbow Bell Adventures is a side-scrolling platform game, the first departure in a series of mostly vertically scrolling shooter games.

Gameplay
Pop'n TwinBee: Rainbow Bell Adventures is the first game in the Twinbee series to be an action title and features three playable characters: Twinbee, Winbee or Gwinbee. All characters use their punch to attack, which can be charged to unleash a punch wave. They have two sets of weapons, one of them is either a short or long-ranged weapon (a hammer for Twinbee, a lasso for Winbee, and throwing rattles for Gwinbee), and the other one is a gun, which is a reference to Detana!! TwinBees cutscene, in which Twinbee is shown with two guns on each hand. All three can temporally fly in eight directions by propelling via a rocket pack that must be charged, as well as hover.

Aside from their weapons, the major difference between the characters is the time they require to fully charge their punch wave or their rocket propeller: Twinbee has an average charging time; Winbee charges her rocket propeller the fastest, but takes the most to charge a punch wave; Gwinbee, on the other hand, fills charges his punch quickly, but takes a while to charge his propeller.

The bell power-up from the rest of the series also appears here, and it allows any of the characters to obtain various kinds of power-ups, depending on the color of the bell, such as the sets of weapons, the gun, speed, options and invincibility. Unlike other Twinbee games, the bells are obtained by defeating enemies instead of shooting clouds.

The game also features a versus mode, in which players must defeat their opponents for three rounds.

Regional differences
The level order in the Japanese version is a set of levels arranged in a quadrilateral form, with an interconnection between different stages. Some stages have alternate exits, similar to Super Mario World. In the European version, the order is strictly linear and a specific level can't be accessed if the previous ones aren't cleared.
The dialogue by Dr. Cinnamon and the pilots (Light, Pastel and Mint) at the level select screen in the European version were deleted.
The European version exclusively uses passwords for back-up, the Japanese one uses primarily a battery back-up, but the passwords are also an option.
The Japanese version has multiple endings depending on the player's performance.

Reception

Upon release, Weekly Famitsu gave it a score of 28 out of 40.

M! Games magazine gave it a score of 77 out of 100.

Mega Fun gave it a score of 82% overall.

Super Play gave the game a score of 70%.

Total! 2+ (B+)

SuperPro 72%

Fun Vision

Video Games 72%

Notes

References

External links

Original Japanese Game Ending, Translated

1994 video games
Platform games
Side-scrolling video games
Super Nintendo Entertainment System games
TwinBee games
Video games developed in Japan
Virtual Console games
Virtual Console games for Wii U